Bruna may refer to:


People

First name
Bruna Amarante da Silva (born 1984), Brazilian footballer
Bruna Benites (born 1985), Brazilian footballer
Bruna Lombardi (born 1952) Brazilian actress and writer
Bruna Hamú (born 1990), Brazilian actress
Bruna Linzmeyer (born 1992), Brazilian actress
Bruna Marquezine (born 1995), Brazilian model
Bruna Papandrea (born 1971), Australian film and television producer
Bruna Tenório (born 1989), Brazilian model
Bruna Wurts, Brazilian artistic roller skater
Bruninha (born 2002), Bruna Santos Nhaia, known also as just Bruna, Brazilian footballer

Surname
Dick Bruna (1927–2017), Dutch author, artist, illustrator and graphic designer
Edgardo Bruna (1947–2017), Chilean actor
Gerardo Bruna (born 1991), Argentinian footballer
Henk Bruna (1916–2008), Dutch publisher and director of the Bruna retailing chain
Israel Bruna (1400–1480), also known as Mahari Bruna, German Rabbi and Posek (decisor on Jewish Law)
Maria Bruna (born 1984), Spanish mathematician
Rav Bruna, Berona, Beruna or Baruna (Hebrew: רב ברונא), second generation Jewish Amora sage of Babylon

Other uses
Bruna (butterfly), a genus of grass skipper butterflies
290 Bruna a astheroid
Bruna (company), a Dutch retailing chain
Palacio Bruna, a palace in Santiago de Chile 
Rabbi Yitzhak ben Bruna ben Yosef Benveniste (Hebrew: יצחק בן ברון בן יוסף בנבנשת), also known by his Arabic name Abū Ibrahīm Iṣḥāq ibn Barūn (died 1128 in Málaga), 11th-century Spanish grammarian of Arabic and Hebrew